"Here I Go" is the only single released from the Infamous Syndicate's debut album Changing the Game. It was written by Rashawnna Guy, Lateefa Harland, Ernest Wilson and Shabazz Curtis, recorded at CRC Studios in 1998, and released via Relativity Records on January 26, 1999. Produced by No I.D., "Here I Go" became a minor hit, making it to #63 on the Hot R&B/Hip-Hop Songs chart and #8 on the Hot Rap Songs.

Track listing

Charts

References

External links

1999 songs
1999 debut singles
Shawnna songs
Songs written by No I.D.
Relativity Records singles
Song recordings produced by No I.D.
Songs written by Shawnna